Karjalan Liitto (in English: Karelian Association) is an interest group for Karelian evacuees.

The association was established by Karelian local governments, parishes and provincial organizations on 20 April 1940 immediately after the Winter War. The first chief aim was to attend to the interests of Karelians who had lost their homes.

Today, the association mainly aims to maintain Karelian culture.

The peaceful return of Karelia has always been one objective of the association.

External links
Karelian Association homepage

History of Karelia